The 2009–10 Combined Counties Football League season was the 32nd in the history of the Combined Counties Football League, a football competition in England.

Premier Division

The Premier Division featured three new teams in a league of 22 teams after the promotion of Bedfont Green to the Southern Football League:
 Croydon, transferred from the Kent Football League
 Dorking, promoted from Division One
 Hanworth Villa, promoted from Division One

League table

Division One

Division One featured five new teams in a league of 21 teams: 
Bedfont Sports, joining from the Middlesex County League
Cobham, relegated from the Premier Division
Croydon Municipal, new club formed as a reserve team for Croydon
Eversley, joining from the Surrey Elite Intermediate League
Hartley Wintney, relegated from the Premier Division

League table

References

 League tables

External links
 Combined Counties League Official Site

2009-10
9